Madhur Chaturvedi (22 July 1952 – 6 July 2008) was one of the foremost print media person in Hindi world. His contribution from the eighties onwards in the area of Hindi reporting is indeed worthy of note. Coverage of news and events by him concerning political, civic, crime, education, media, health, entertainment and sports matters stand out as a model for junior reporters for their clarity and objectivity in expression. His clear text presented with delightful humour and simplicity establishes an instant rapport with the readers. He deserves credit for starting a new trend for absorbing reporting and for setting up a bench mark of excellence in coverage of civic affairs.

Early years 

Born in Lucknow, Madhur had his early education at Lucknow, Sitapur and Mathura districts of Uttar Pradesh. He picked up an interest in Hindi from his parents, Abinash and Pramilla Chaturvedi. Both of them were deeply fond of Hindi literature. Madhur was specially interested in cricket, riding and films. He was known to be a bold and frank student who did not hesitate to speak his mind in front of his elders.

Initiation in Journalism 

While still studying for his graduation at Lucknow University, Madhur joined the staff of 'Pioneer', a leading daily of the time. He was imparted the basic lessons in journalism under the watchful eyes of legendary editor, S N Ghosh. After his initial breaking in period as a sub editor on the desk, he was assigned the University and the crime beats. A few months later he got a lateral shift to 'Swatantra Bharat' a sister publication in Hindi. He was not yet 20. He learnt the basics as a sub reporter. To be objective and to re-check a story again before filing. Importance of cultivating a vast net work of sources. To earn and retain their confidence. His care free and fun loving nature helped him make friends easily. Most of them became his useful sources. He was trained by the stalwarts of Hindi journalism like Ashokji, Shiv Singh Saroj, Chandrodaya Dikshit, Surendra Chaturvedi and Shambhu Nath Kapoor. 

Madhur was soon to make his mark as a reporter. His copy was appreciated for its captivating introduction, diversity in approach and a balanced coverage. His text was simple and yet fresh.

Within a year of his joining Swatantra Bharat, Madhur was deputed to cover the Vidhan Parishad (Legislative Council). He was the first journalist to have been named a reporter in over twenty years by his paper. This was a big opportunity to learn about reporting of legislative affairs. He came in close contact with the Chief Minister H N Bahuguna, other ministers and opposition leaders. He earned the admiration of his peers for his high integrity and incisive intelligence. He made it a point to approach the leaders for clarification if he had not fully understood their speeches in the house. He did not merely rely upon official transcripts. This not earned only him the gratitude of politicians but helped him make his reports factually correct and more comprehensive. Madhur's selection to join a group of reporters for a training in defence journalism at this stage gave him a valuable insight into the functioning and role of the armed forces. In later years he came up with a few very elaborate reports on military matters.

Joining the Times of India 

In early 1976 Madhur was selected to join the Times of India group as a trainee journalist. He was undoubtedly the most brilliant in his batch. The trainees were exposed to and taught by eminent journalists and writers like Khushwant Singh, Girilal Jain, Inder Malhotra, Mahavir Adhikari, Aravind Kumar and Kamaleshwar. 

After completion of his training Madhur was picked up by the Navbharat Times for their reporting bureau. He was asked to cover the city and the Bombay (now Mumbai) Municipal Corporation. He carried out his assignments with great sincerity and enthusiasm. His interviews of leaders like Prathibha Patil (later President of India), Bal Tackeray & Manohar Joshi were greatly appreciated.

A few years later he was transferred to Delhi to join the bureau of Navbharat Times. Soon thereafter he was selected to report for Sandhya Times, an eveninger. He rose to be its Dy Chief Reporter and over the years assigned various beats. He was the leader of the team that took the paper to its largest ever circulation. 

A short resume of the fews spheres which he covered as a reporter would show his profound common sense, capacity to work hard and give a new dimension to the topics he covered.

Medical and Health 

Madhur worked very hard to carry out a broad and intensive study of diverse issues relating to health care, diseases preventive programmes, state of hospitals and pharmaceutical industry. He was specially keen to report new advancements in surgery and medical facilities. His report on the then newly introduced technique of Lithotripsy and interview with Dr Bhimsen Bansal was a comprehensive and informative coverage1 . Similarly, an account of risk of contracting TB in crowded places like DTC buses was a grim warning to the dangers from mass transportation systems. 2

Political Field 

A reporting of political developments and changing power play calls for a deep understanding of political aspirations and agenda of party leaders. Madhur studied the agenda and priorities of major political parties and alliances. He was able to sensitise his readers to the challenges of a limited and temporary nature of election verdicts when he discussed the poll prospects in Andhra Pradesh .3 His reports bear a testimony to his astute vision that could see through intense political ambitions and shrewd personal rivalries of power seekers. He painted a vivid catalogue of the film personalities who had entered the political platforms .4 There were instances of his satirical depiction of the big role played by astrologers played in political predictions . 5 Five years later, he was amongst the first in the media to highlight the need for electoral reforms . 6

Stage and Drama 

The distinct appeal and indirect approach of a theatre performance never failed to amaze Madhur for its memorable impact. He was particularly impressed by the contemporary nature of themes that inspired the actors and the audience alike. Capacity of a street play as a medium to arouse the public consciousness was articulated by him long almost three decades before Anna Hazare attracted a mass following .7 

Deeply fond of music and Urdu shayari, Madhru was at his illustrative best when writing about songs and lyrics. In a frank resume of the mass appreciation of a Pakistani singer, he spoke of the simple and yet diverse quality of Mehdi Hasan's voice .8 Ten years later, he was to acknowledge the increasing popularity in India of the same singer.9 For almost two decades he was regularly invited by the All India Radio for film reviews.

Sports and Games 

Never to give up his childhood love for games Madhur wrote hundred of articles on cricket, tennis, hockey and other games. He was generous in his praise and yet quite balanced in following a match. The strange tactics commonly employed by the sports men to gain popularity came in for his sharp commentary in an article .10 A tribute to John McEnroe was a study in a fulsome analysis of a brilliant career .11

Civic life 

While writing on every day events and common happenings, Madhur was to display an uncanny flair to address diverse angles connected with the topic. To illustrate, he pointed out that reduction in duty on tea manufacture that led to a noticeable increase in exports. At the same time he underlined how a cup of tea refreshes a common man's daily life .12 Yet in another piece he discussed the grim situation due to road accidents in capital city Delhi which had seen a twelve times increase in number of vehicles in last thirty years . 13 Impact of rising prices on foot falls in the markets during festival time prior to Deepawali was the theme of an article that reported the brisk sale at counters of popular sweet shops .14

Education 

Never a pessimist, Madhur took care to always draw attention of his readers to a ray of hope in what otherwise appeared grim moments. He wrote about the big help the study loans could do to students desirous of pursuing higher studies.15 He was able to differentiate the challenges that a student union election posed before the candidate as compared to the uncertainty faced by political rivals in a general election.16

Interviews 

While interviewing persons of eminence, Madhur was able to easily put them at ease and get a quote that never failed to create an impact on his readers. He took care to retain wit and humour in his prose. An interview with movie director Bappi Soni was appreciated for the warmth and simplicity of questions and replies evoked.17 An interview with a medico researching on application of robots in medical field was brilliantly recounted to explain to common reader the huge benefits expected.18 

Madhur deserves credit for the vast range of topics that he wrote with brilliance. Not one to exploit information technology for its enormous capacity to research and reproduce, he nevertheless worked very hard to cultivate and maintain his contacts and sources. He was never stereotyped in his approach. He was extremely careful to check and recheck his facts. Above all, he was scrupulously honest in his articles and exhibited high integrity while writing about men and events. 

He sincerely believed in total dedication and a belief in his paper and the editors he served under. Throughout his journalistic career Madhur never showed any dissatisfaction with 'Swatantra Bharat' or 'The Times of India' publications, wherever he worked. He was always very respectful to all the editors he served with; S N Ghosh, Ashokji, Akshay Kumar Jain, Mahaveer Adhikari, Anand Jain, Sat Soni or Madhurendra Sinha. 

In his entire career as reporter he never accepted any offer to shift to a desk job or editorial assignment. The glamour of electronic media could never lure him to move away from hard core newspaper world. Madhur traversed brilliantly on his coverage of political, civic, social and educational matters. But for the economic and financial matters (which he did write though occasionally) there was no sphere of actively that he did not report with full passion and depth. His reports, features, interviews and analysis will be a model text for Hindi journalists.

His language used was simple but extremely impressionable. He wrote short sentences, picking up Urdu and English words also to make his piece convey maximum effect. His language was compact and precise. He sough help from the copy desk to get optimum assistance in get up and appearance. Very few articles are now available of his writings in English.

Death 

Madhur met with an untimely death at Delhi on 6 July 2008.

References 

1	Pet ka Pathar Todne Ke Machine, Sandhya Times, 1 August 1992
2	Blue Line Buses Men Safar Se TB Hone Ka Khatra
3	Andhra Pradesh Mein Kya Sthayee Sarkaar Banegi?  Swantantra Bharat, 13 February 1978.
4	Sitaron Ke Rajneeti – Tamasho Ke Bad Ki Sachhai, Amrit Prabhat, Sunday, 9 March 1980.
5	Jyotishiyon Ka Kahena Hai – Rajiv Gandhi Prime Minister Baneage, Sandhya Times, 2 May 1991.
6	Jaroorat Ab Bhi Hai Chunaav Sudhar Ki, Sandhya Times, 5 August 1996.
7	Bhrishtachar Se Ladhata Raha Nukkad Natak; Sandhya Times, 18 December 1989.
8	Mehdi Hasan; Bees Hazar Awazen; 18 May 1978.
9	Mehdi Hasan Ka Hai Andaze Bayan Aur; Swantra Bharat, 30 January 1988.
10	Cricket mein Kushti Ke Nazare, Khel Bharati; 16 – 30 April 1982
11	Jeevat Vala Khilari Hai McEnroe; Sandhya Times, 14 December 1982.
12	Chai Mithaas Yad Rakhiye, Kaduwahat Bhool Jayeai; Amrit Prabhat, 22 June 1980.
13	Sadak Durghatana ke liye Doshi Kaun?  Sandhya Times, 10 January 1995.
14	Bazar mein sub kuch hai, Grahak kam hai, 12 November 1993.
15	Dooriyan Najdeekiyan Ban Gayee; Sandhya Times, 5 April 2006.
16	Dilli Abhi Door Hai; Sandhya Times, 7 October 1993.
17	Bachhon Ko Coco Cola Nahi Mila to Bappi Soni Ko Pani Pila Diya; Sandhya Times, 24 February 1993.
18	Muhammad Taheen Ameen Se Bachhon Ne Kaya Poocha?  Sandhaya Times, 3 June 1993

1952 births
2008 deaths
Hindi journalists